The 2004 Big East men's basketball tournament, a part of the 2003–04 NCAA Division I men's basketball season, took place from March 10–13, 2004 at Madison Square Garden in New York City. It was a single-elimination tournament with four rounds and the four highest seeds (two from each Big East division) received byes in the first round. The twelve Big East teams with the best conference records were invited to participate.  Its winner, Connecticut, received the Big East Conference's automatic bid to the 2004 NCAA tournament, the sixth for the Huskies, tying Georgetown  for the most Big East tournament championships.

Bracket

Note: By finishing below twelfth place during the regular season, Miami and St. John's did not qualify for the tournament.

Games

1st round:  Wednesday, March 10

Noon

2PM

7PM

9PM

Quarterfinals:  Thursday, March 11

Noon

2 PM

7 PM

9 PM

Semifinals:  Friday, March 12

7 PM

9 PM

Championship game

Awards
Dave Gavitt Trophy (Most Outstanding Player): Ben Gordon, Connecticut

All-Tournament Team
Jaron Brown, Pittsburgh
Taliek Brown, Connecticut
Carl Krauser, Pittsburgh
Craig Smith, Boston College
Chris Taft, Pittsburgh

References  

 Big East Championship Results

Tournament
Big East men's basketball tournament
Basketball in New York City
College sports in New York City
Sports competitions in New York City
Sports in Manhattan
Big East men's basketball tournament
Big East men's basketball tournament
2000s in Manhattan
Madison Square Garden